This is a list of radio stations in Israel.

Israel Public Broadcasting

FM
FM broadcasting operated by Israeli stations:

North and Upper Galilee

Safed area

Haifa area

Beit She'an area

Jerusalem and its region

Central Israel

Beersheba area

Negev and Northern Negev

Ha Arava

Eilat

AM
AM stations operated by the Israel Broadcasting Authority

Galilee panhandle

Galilee

Jerusalem area

Central area

Eilat

Commercial broadcasters

Center

North and Upper Galilee

See also
Media of Israel

Notes

External links
 Israel Broadcasting Authority - Reception Table
 Radio Locator - Israel Radio Stations

Radio stations
Israel